Wilhelm Stahl Provincial Hospital is a Provincial government funded hospital for the Inxuba Yethemba Local Municipality area in Middelburg, Eastern Cape in South Africa.

The hospital departments include Emergency department, Out Patients Department, Surgical Services, Medical Services, Operating Theatre & CSSD Services, Pharmacy, Anti-Retroviral (ARV) treatment for HIV/AIDS, Post Trauma Counseling Services, Laundry Services, Kitchen Services and Mortuary.

References
 Eastern Cape Department of Health website - Chris Hani District Hospitals

Hospitals in the Eastern Cape
Chris Hani District Municipality